The 2015 World Mixed Doubles Curling Championship was held from April 18 to 25 at the Ice Cube Curling Center in Sochi, Russia. The event will be held in conjunction with the 2015 World Senior Curling Championships.

Teams
The teams are listed as follows:

Round-robin standings

Round-robin results

Group A

Saturday, April 18
Draw 1
9:00

Sunday, April 19
Draw 2
11:15

Draw 3
21:00

Monday, April 20
Draw 4
11:15

Tuesday, April 21
Draw 5
8:00

Draw 6
17:45

Wednesday, April 22
Draw 7
19:30

Thursday, April 23
Draw 8
11:15

Draw 9
17:45

Group B

Saturday, April 18
Draw 1
12:30

Draw 2
19:30

Sunday, April 19
Draw 3
14:30

Monday, April 20
Draw 4
9:00

Tuesday, April 21
Draw 5
11:15

Draw 6
21:00

Wednesday, April 22
Draw 7
12:30

Thursday, April 23
Draw 8
8:00

Draw 9
14:30

Group C

Saturday, April 18
Draw 1
16:00

Sunday, April 19
Draw 2
8:00

Draw 3
17:45

Monday, April 20
Draw 4
12:30

Draw 5
19:30

Tuesday, April 21
Draw 6
14:30

Wednesday, April 22
Draw 7
9:00

Draw 8
16:00

Thursday, April 23
Draw 9
21:00

Tiebreakers
Friday, April 24 8:00

Playoffs

Qualification Game
Friday, April 24, 15:30

Quarterfinals
Friday, April 24, 20:00

Semifinals
Saturday, April 25, 10:30

Bronze medal game
Saturday, April 25, 15:30

Gold medal game
Saturday, April 25, 15:30

References

External links

World Mixed Doubles Curling Championship
2015 in curling
2015 in Russian sport
Sports competitions in Sochi
International curling competitions hosted by Russia
21st century in Sochi
April 2015 sports events in Russia